Adelaide Oval is a cricket ground in Adelaide, Australia. It is the home ground of the South Australia cricket team and both the men's and women's Adelaide Strikers as well as Australian rules football and soccer teams. The ground has hosted international cricket matches, including Test, One Day International (ODI) and Twenty20 Internationals (T20I). , the ground has hosted 80 Test matches, with the first in 1884 when Australia played England. It has staged 85 ODIs, the first of which was in 1975 when Australia beat the West Indies by five wickets. The ground has also hosted five T20Is, the first in 2011 when England beat Australia by one wicket.

The first century at the ground was scored by Australian Percy McDonnell. He made 124 during the first Test of the 1884–85 English tour of Australia in the first Test match at the Adelaide Oval. The first overseas player to score a century at the ground was Englishman Billy Barnes, who made 134 in the same match in which McDonnell made his century. Australian David Warner's triple century, against Pakistan in November 2019, is the highest individual score by a batsman at the ground and was the first triple century at the ground. Australia's Michael Clarke has scored the most centuries at the venue with seven. , 185 Test centuries have been scored at the stadium.

England's David Gower was the first player to score an ODI century at the ground. He made 109 against New Zealand during the 1982–83 Australian Tri-Series. Graeme Wood became the first Australian to score an ODI century at the Adelaide Oval when he scored 104 not out against the West Indies in January 1985. Brian Lara's 156 for the West Indies against Pakistan is the highest ODI score by a batsman at the ground. 36 ODI centuries have been scored at the Adelaide Oval . David Warner of Australia has made the highest score at the ground, scoring 100 not out.

Key
 Score denotes the number of runs scored by the batsman in an innings.
 * denotes that the batsman was not out.
 Parentheses i.e. (1/3) next to the player's name denotes his century number at the Adelaide Oval.
 Inns. denotes the number of the innings in the match.
 Balls denotes the number of balls faced by the batsman in an innings.
 NR denotes that the statistic was not recorded.
 Date denotes the date on which the match started.
 Result denotes the result of the player's team.
 Drawn denotes that the match was drawn which is when a team does not complete its innings by the scheduled end of play.

List of centuries

Test cricket

One Day Internationals

Twenty20 Internationals

Women's Test cricket

References

Further reading
 Downer, Sidney (1972). 100 Not Out: A Century of Cricket on the Adelaide Oval

Adelaide
Adelaide
Centuries